Kaarin Louise Fairfax (born 30 September 1959) is an Australian actress, director and singer who played the role of 'Dolour Darcy' in two TV miniseries, The Harp in the South (1986) and its sequel Poor Man's Orange (1987) based on books of the same names by Ruth Park. She has also acted in other Australian television series throughout the 1980s, 1990s and 2000s, and recorded music under the name of Mary-Jo Starr. Fairfax had the role of 'Deb Mathieson' on Australian Broadcasting Corporation TV series, Bed of Roses (2008, 2010).

Fairfax played the mother in the Rachel Perkins 2001 short film One Night the Moon, a story of racial prejudice in the outback. Fairfax is the former wife of Australian musician Paul Kelly—they met in 1988— their two children are Madeleine (born 1991) and Memphis (born 1993). Memphis appeared with her parents in One Night the Moon, the couple separated not long after the film's release. She appeared in the Australian sitcom Col'n Carpenter, a spin-off from The Comedy Company, after Vicki Blanche left the series.

By 2008, Fairfax had established The Little Theatre Company in Frankston, Victoria, in honour of her father George Fairfax.  Fairfax directed Frankston Lights in January 2009, it was a musical which included songs co-written by Madeleine and Memphis and Robert McHugh. Kaarin has been working extensively since that time, joining forces with Sally Baillieu and directing The Wetlands Project, One Last Chance- performed in the Wetlands at Tootgarook. She runs with Sally The Lineup at Frankston Arts Centre Cube37. A musical mentorship program for young emerging artists. In January 2012 she directed Good People for Red Stitch Actors Theatre. Her children Madeleine and Memphis have recorded their first EP with additional band member Sam Humphrey. The band's name is Wishful, the EP is called Fifty Days and it was produced by their father Paul Kelly. Kaarin and Sally have an Arts program on 3RPP Radio Port Phillip on the Mornington Peninsula, called Arts About.

In 2015, she co-starred in the film StalkHer.

Music career
Fairfax was a vocalist for Wild Blue Yonder, a Sydney-based band from 1985 which had a varied line-up but had no known recordings. In the late 1970s she was part of a comedy vocal trio The Droolettes which also included Gina Riley and Gina Mendoza with Geoff O'Connell on piano.  During 1989–1991 she supplied backing vocals on tracks by Paul Kelly & the Messengers. In 1990, under the name, Mary-Jo Starr, she released three singles and an album, Too Many Movies. She was nominated for the 1991 ARIA Award for Best New Talent and appeared on the Breaking Ground - New Directions in Country Music compilation which was also nominated for Best Country Album. She joined Truckasaurus in 1993, a Melbourne-based Grungey/country band which released Truckasaurus in October.

Mary-Jo Starr Discography

Albums

Singles

Awards and nominations

ARIA Music Awards
The ARIA Music Awards is an annual awards ceremony that recognises excellence, innovation, and achievement across all genres of Australian music. They commenced in 1987.

|
|-
| 1991
| Too Many Movies
| ARIA Award for Best New Talent
| 
|
|-

References 

1959 births
Australian television actresses
Living people
Paul Kelly (Australian musician)
Actresses from Melbourne
Singers from Melbourne